Renault Trucks is a French commercial truck manufacturer with corporate headquarters at Saint-Priest near Lyon. Originally part of Renault, it has been a subsidiary of  the Volvo Group  since 2001.

From its beginnings in 1978 to 2002, the company was called  (Renault Industrial Vehicles), from 1992 on officially written as Renault V. I.. Until 2002, Renault Véhicules Industriels also manufactured buses.

History
Renault first began building dedicated commercial trucks in 1906. In 1956, however Renault stopped producing trucks and buses under its own name. Instead, the company Saviem was formed as a subsidiary of their own commercial products with the manufacturers Somua and Latil. Lighter commercials kept on using the Renault name, however. From 1957 on, Saviem was also used as the brand name for the trucks and buses produced by the company.

As a result of French industrial policy, in 1975 state-owned Renault also acquired the truck and bus manufacturer Berliet from Citroën (at that time a part of the Michelin corporation). In 1978, Berliet and Saviem were merged to form Renault Véhicules Industriels. Again, the old brand names were retained for two more years while the model lineups were gradually incorporated, until in 1980 they were replaced by the name Renault.

In 1971, Saviem became a member of the Euro Truck Development Group or Club of Four, a cooperation between four European truck producers (Saviem, Volvo, DAF and Magirus-Deutz, which soon after became a part of Iveco) for the production of medium-sized trucks. Since 1975 the truck models resulting from this cooperation were built by Saviem and later Renault, even until 2001. They were also sold on the North American market as the Mack Mid-Liner or Manager.

In 1978, PSA Group bought Chrysler's European operations. Included in the deal were commercial vehicle operations in the UK and Spain, which at that time used the brand name Dodge. PSA however sold them on to RVI in 1983, having itself little interest in the commercial vehicle market. The newly acquired operations in the UK had their origins in the commercial vehicle branch of the Rootes Group which originally carried the brand names Karrier and Commer. Some of the models built there were continued in production for several years by RVI in Dunstable, Bedfordshire, who also kept the Dodge brand name for these models, albeit in combination with the Renault badge. In 1988 the company was subject to a Fire Brigades Union inquiry due to eight Dodge fire engines involved in crashes. Until 1992 the UK division was known as Renault Truck Industries, after which it then took the international Renault V.I. name.

In Spain, however, where Renault already was recognized as a local automobile producer, the Dodge trucks, which originally had been developed by the manufacturer Barreiros Diesel, were rebadged as Renaults and soon after replaced by French-designed models.

In 1987, Renault Véhicules Industriels took over from its parent company Renault a 42% stake in the American manufacturer Mack Trucks which became a fully owned subsidiary of Renault Véhicules Industriels in 1990.

In 1991, RVI purchased a 37.5% shareholding in French bodybuilder Heuliez Bus. In 1994, RVI purchased a 34% stake in the Czech bus manufacturer Karosa, increasing its ownership to a majority 51% in 1996 and 96% in 2000. In 1997 Renault V. I. entered into a cooperation agreement with the Finnish truck producer Sisu. In 2002 the company signed a deal with the Chinese company Dongfeng Motor to manufacture engines.

Renault Trucks took part in the FIA European Championship, running Renault Premium powered by 13-litre DXi13 engines. The Renault Trucks-MKR Technology team won in 2010.

Also, the Uruguayan plant of cars owned by Nordex S.A. in Uruguay has made since 2004 the Renault Trucks models like Midlum series.

The Volvo Group invested about €2 billion to develop a new line of Renault Trucks vehicles (C, D, K, T) which were introduced through 2013 replacing the previous models.

Changes of ownership
As part of Renault's restructuring following privatisation in 1996, the heavy vehicles operations of bus and truck were divested. In 1999, the Renault and Karosa bus and coach operations were split off from Renault Véhicules Industriels and merged with Fiat-Iveco's bus and coach operations to form the jointly owned subsidiary Irisbus. In 2003, Irisbus became a full subsidiary of Iveco and the brand Renault on its products was replaced by the brand Irisbus.

In April 2000, Renault agreed to terms with Volvo to purchase its truck manufacturing business with Volvo in turn to relinquish its 15% shareholding in Renault and Renault buy a 20% shareholding in Volvo. The transaction which included Mack Trucks, but not Renault's stake in Irisbus, was completed on 2 January 2001. RVI was renamed Renault Trucks in 2002. In October 2010 Renault reduced its shareholding in Volvo to 5%. In December 2012, Renault sold its remaining shares in Volvo.

Military vehicles

The Renault Trucks Defense division is wholly owned by Renault Trucks and is based in Versailles, France. It trades on its 1975 acquisition of Berliet and claims to have over 30,000 vehicles in use around the world. Its status as the leading supplier to the French Army was put in jeopardy in 2010 when the government placed a $214m order to Italian competitor Iveco. In 2016, Volvo announced its intention of divesting Renault Trucks Defense, as part of the selling of its Government Sales division.

It manufactures a range of special vehicles aimed at the defense and security markets, including the Sherpa, VAB armoured personnel carrier, the AMC armoured multirole carrier and Kerax ranges.

In 2006 Renault Trucks took over ACMAT, but the defence and security vehicle manufacturer retained its own name and identity.

On 24 May 2018, Renault Trucks Defense was renamed as Arquus.

Products

Current products

Delivery range
 Renault Master (Renault-built vehicle sold by Renault Trucks dealerships under a special agreement)

Distribution range
 Renault Trucks D

Construction range
 Renault Trucks C
 Renault Trucks K

Long distance range
 Renault Trucks T

Military SUVs
 Sherpa Light

Military trucks 

 Renault GBC 180
 Renault Sherpa 5

Former truck models

 Dodge 50
 Dodge 100
 Dodge 300
 Renault Access, joint venture with Dennis Eagle, replaced Renault Puncher in 2010
 Renault C
 Renault B/Renault Messenger 
 Renault J
 Renault M/Renault S (Midliner)
 Renault G (Manager/Maxter)
 Renault Kerax
 Renault R (Major)
 Renault Magnum
 Renault Mascott
 Renault Maxity (built in Spain as a version of the Nissan Cabstar)
 Renault Midlum (sold in Australia as Mack Midlum)
 Renault Puncher 280 HP / 20 or 26 tonnes.
 Renault Premium (sold in Australia as Mack Premium, in New Zealand as Mack Quantum)
 Renault Premium Lander
 Renault Premium Route

Former bus models

 Renault PR100, previously sold under the Berliet name, launched in 1972. Some Australian versions of the PR100.2 carried dual Renault and Mack logos
 Renault PR112 was a 1994 upgrade to the PR100 using a front end designed by coachbuilder Safra
 Renault PR180.2 was the articulated version of the PR100, launched in 1981, later to become the Renault PR112 following a facelift
 Renault R312, replaced in 1996 by the Renault Agora, then renamed Irisbus Agora in 2002. In Australia it was sold as the Renault PR100.3
 Renault Recreo school bus built by Karosa
 Renault SC10, initially sold as the Saviem SC10 from 1965, and then in 1981 it was upgraded to the Renault SC10R when the distinctive curved front window was lost. The SC10U, and its replacement SC10RA featured the unique open rear deck.
 Renault Tracer, replaced by Renault Arés in 2000 and renamed Irisbus Arés in 2001

Former coaches models
 Renault E7, originally launched as the Saviem E7 in 1969
 Renault PR14, originally launched in 1974 as the Berliet Crusair
 Renault PR80S, derived from the Renault PR100
 Renault S-Series coach was marketed as Renault (such as the Renault S45), Saviem and Saviem-Chausson during its production period of 1977 to 1993
 Renault FR1, sold for a short time in the US as Mack FR1. Facelifted and renamed Renault Iliade in 1997

Former trolley bus and tram models

 Renault ER100, originally launched under the Berliet name in 1977, replaced by the Irisbus Cristalis
 Renault PER180, diesel-trolleybus hybrid based on the Renault PR 180.2
 Renault Civis was quickly rebranded Irisbus Civis following the sale of Renault Bus

Concept vehicles
 Renault Radiance (2004)
 Renault Magnum Vega

References

External links

 
 Arquus website
 Spanish Renault trucks gallery

Bus manufacturers of France
Companies based in Lyon
Defence companies of France
Defunct bus manufacturers
French companies established in 1978
French subsidiaries of foreign companies
Military vehicle manufacturers
Renault
 
 
Truck manufacturers of France
Vehicle manufacturing companies established in 1978
Volvo Group
Volvo Trucks